The Central District of Ungut County is in Ardabil province, Iran. Prior to the establishment of the county, the constituent parts of the district were in Germi County. The only city in the district is also the capital of the county, Tazeh Kand, whose population in 2016 was 2,645 in 717 households.

References 

Districts of Ardabil Province

Populated places in Ardabil Province

fa:بخش مرکزی شهرستان انگوت